The Pearl is a condominium tower in the Oliver neighbourhood of Edmonton, Alberta, Canada. It is the city's 5th tallest residential building.

See also
List of tallest buildings in Edmonton

References

External links
The Pearl

Skyscrapers in Edmonton
Residential skyscrapers in Canada
Towers in Alberta
Residential condominiums in Canada

Residential buildings completed in 2015